In France, the Parliament sitting in High Court (Haute Cour) is the jurisdiction responsible for pronouncing the impeachment of the President of the Republic "if he should fail to carry out his duties in a way manifestly incompatible with the exercise of his mandate". The jurisdiction's functioning is governed by Article 68 of the Constitution, whose current form is its 2007 edit.

External links
"Le Sénat, Haute Cour de justice sous la IIIe République" ("The Senate, High Court of Justice under the 3rd Republic"), on www.senat.fr 

French public law